Bertha is the name of the site of a Roman fort north of the site of modern Perth, Scotland, at the confluence of the rivers Almond and Tay. It is half a mile east of the modern farm of "Berthapark" and is a scheduled ancient monument.

The name "Bertha" was originally used by medieval Scots historians, such as John of Fordun and Walter Bower, who did not know the original name for the site and who adapted a version of Perth - "Berth". The Romans probably called the site Tamia, after a native name for the River Tay. In early medieval times the abandoned site was still used for ceremonial purposes by Pictish and Gaelic kings, when it was called "Rathinveramon".

The fort was a supply base built around AD83 to support the occasional Roman expeditions into north-east Scotland. At that time, it was at the highest navigable point on the Tay. It is possible that the site was re-used on three occasions up to the 3rd century

The  site was identified in the 18th century.

References

History of Perth, Scotland
Roman auxiliary forts in Scotland
Scheduled Ancient Monuments in Perth and Kinross